Imaginary Third is the third album by the alternative rock band The Van Pelt, released in 2014 on La Castanya Records. Although officially presented as a previously unreleased third album, Imaginary Third is a collection of songs previously released between 1997 and 1998 by The Van Pelt (Self Titled EP) and The Lapse (Betrayal!).

Track listing
Infinite Me – 2:29
The Threat – 2:52
ABCD's Of Fascism – 3:04
Three People Wide At All Times – 5:10
The Betrayal – 2:09
Democratic Teacher's Union – 0:57
Evil High – 2:29
The Speeding Train – 4:03

Personnel
Toko Yasuda (bass)
Neil O'Brien (drums)
Brian Maryansky (guitar, backing vocals)
Chris Leo (guitar, vocals)

References

2014 albums
The Van Pelt albums